WATT+VOLT is a Greek company in the development of energy solutions, based in Athens. It is engaged in the trade and supply of electricity, natural gas and gas emissions. WATT+VOLT also provides IoT (Internet of Things) solutions .

History

2011 

 Establishment of WATT AND VOLT S.A.
 Granting of License for Electricity Supply and Trading

2012 

 Installation of the first "smart" meters for the monitoring of energy consumption in real time, within the "New Innovative Entrepreneurship" framework of the NSRF
 Development of the online WATT + VOLT "Partners" platform for the registration of partners’ applications for electricity supply

2013 

 Commencement of Electricity Trading Activity
 ISO 9001 Certification

2014 

 Launch of MyWatt application, for the electronic management of the electricity bill by the customer
 Establishment of the subsidiary in Bulgaria, WATT + VOLT Bulgaria EOOD
 Granting of Electricity Supply and Trading License to WATT + VOLT Bulgaria EOOD

2015 

 Launch of MyWatt mobile application for iOS and Android devices
 Establishment of ESC (Energy Services Company)
 Establishment of the subsidiary company in Serbia, WATT AND VOLT DOO Beograd
 Granting of Electricity Supply and Trading License to WATT AND VOLT DOO Beograd
 Granting of Natural Gas Supply License to WATT AND VOLT S.A.

2016 

 Registration and activation of WATT AND VOLT S.A. in the European Energy Exchange (EEX) - the 1st Greek Private Company participating in it
 2 Awards to MyWatt in the Mobile Excellence Awards
 Participation in the European Project encompass. WATT + VOLT leads the extroversion and communication of the project across Europe
 Participation in the European Program HORIZON 2020 
 Launch of the home solution IoT, smartwatt
 Recognition of WATT + VOLT by the London Stock Exchange as one of the 1000 companies that inspire Europe

2017 

 Opening of WATT + VOLT stores nationwide - the first private company to do so after 2012
 4 gold awards to smartwatt platforms in the Energy Mastering Awards and Mobile Excellence Awards
 Launch of the holistic IoT solution, smart everything

2018 

 Commencement of Natural Gas Supply activity
 Launch of the electronic sending of bills service (e-bill)   
 Installation of the first charging stations for electric vehicles
 Development of the WATT + VOLT e-learning platform
 Operation of 15 stores throughout Greece
 Upgrade of MyWatt web application and addition of new features

2019 

 Company Awarded as National Winner in the European Business Awards in the Development Strategy of the Year category
 Participation in the European HEAT4COOL Program
 Founding partner with leading participation in the Greek Cluster is ZEB
 Establishment of the Group's subsidiary, WATT + VOLT Skopje
 Registration and commencement of the Company's activity in the Hungarian Energy Exchange Market HUPX (Hungarian Power Exchange)
 Exceeding the limit of 100,000 supply customers (March)
 Commencement of trading of emission allowances, EUA, in the European Energy Exchange
 Launch of Net Metering service
 Operation of 35 stores throughout Greece
 "Smart" electronic customer services via call center
 Upgrade of MyWatt mobile application and addition of new features
 Launch of Gas Boiler Installation service
 Provision of electrical and energy solutions and launch of LEC service (Licensed Electrician Certification)

2020 

 Company awarded by FT as one of the 1000 fastest growing companies in Europe
 The European project enCOMPASS is successfully completed and for WATT + VOLT in particular the results of the extroversion are characterized as exceeding expectations. (outreach results)
 WATT + VOLT is the coordinator in the European PRECEPT Project
 Participation in the European BRIGHT Project
 Establishment of the group's subsidiary trading company in Albania, WATT + VOLT Albania
 Issuance of operating license by RAE (Regulatory Authority for Energy) for the activity of WATT + VOLT as a RES Aggregator
 Launch of "Chargespot" application for charging electric vehicles
 Operation of 60 stores throughout Greece
 Electronic contracts with digital signature for customer service without physical presence.
 Addition of gas supply management section via MyWatt (mobile and web application)
 Launch of Gas Boiler and Heat Pump Maintenance services
 Menoumespiti action to provide a discount to WATT + VOLT customers during the lockdown period – support to the "Shedia" organization

2021 

 Launch of the e-contract, the first end-to-end service for the conclusion of a contract for the supply of electricity exclusively online.
 Update of MyWatt mobile application with the addition of Quick Login for easy and secure access to the app with fingerprint or face ID and a four-digit PIN.

Awards 

 2016: Mobile Excellence Awards 2016 – two awards to MyWatt
 2017: Four gold awards to smartwatt platforms in the Energy Mastering Awards and Mobile Excellence Awards
 2019: European Business Awards: National Winner for Greece in the European Business Awards
 2020: 1st among Greek companies and 204th in the overall ranking of the Financial Times FT 1000 list with the 1000 fastest growing companies in Europe 2020.
 2021: Franchise Award in the Most Innovative Products & Services category
 2021: Distinction Most admirable companies in Greece, for Fortune magazine and special section THE ADMIRABLES 2021
 2021: RETAIL BUSINESS AWARDS 2021, silver award in the Retail Stores Energy category.
 2022: FRANCHISE AWARDS 2022 for FAST GROWTH FRANCHISE
 2022: PRODUCT OF THE YEAR in the category "Electricity program", for zerO
 2022: RETAIL BUSINESS AWARDS 2022, bronze award in the "Retail Stores/ Energy" category for Elefsina store
 2022: CONTENT MARKETING AWARDS 2022, silver award in the "Best use of content marketing for lead generation" category
 2022: HR AWARDS 2022, golden award in the  "Best Team Building Program" category

MyWatt 
WATT+VOLT created a mobile application, MyWatt, to manage and budget daily life electricity data by individual users. This application is aimed at allowing individuals to limit or control their electricity expenses, facilitates comparison of data with previous years by showing graphs and allow the users to pay the bills using credit cards. The application also features account related clarifications by allowing the user to communicate to the company via the app.

Subsidiaries 
 WATT+VOLT DOO Beograd – 100% subsidiary of WATT+VOLT Group - was established on 12 April 2015 and officially received the license of power trading in Serbia.
 WATT+VOLT Bulgaria EOOD was established in mid-2014 and is now a member of WATT+VOLT.
 WATT+VOLT EMT - In January 2015, WATT+VOLT acquired 50% stake of CE group forming WATT+VOLT EMT, licensed of Trading and Power Supply in Bulgaria.

See also

 Energy in Greece

References

Electric power companies of Greece
Greek brands